Leonid Arkadevich Taranenko (born June 13, 1956) is a former Soviet/Belarusian weightlifter and coach. His 266 kg clean and jerk in 1988 was the heaviest lift in competition for 33 years, until Lasha Talakhadze exceeded it, lifting 267 at the 2021 World Weightlifting Championships.

Weightlifting career 

Taranenko trained at VSS Uradzhai in Minsk. His first major success took place at the 1980 Olympics, when, competing for the Soviet Union, he won the gold medal in the 110 kilogram class with a 422.5 kg total.

He was unable to compete in the 1984 Olympics in Los Angeles due to the Soviet boycott, but competed in the 1984 Friendship Games, where he won the 110 kg class with a world record total of 442.5 kg, exceeding the winning total in Los Angeles (by Norberto Oberburger) by 52.5 kg.

After this, Taranenko moved up to the super-heavyweight class. Lifting in Canberra, Australia on November 26, 1988, he set a world record of 266 kg in the clean and jerk, and 476 kg in the total, having lifted 210 kg in the snatch.

While these results are no longer recognized as official world records due to subsequent restructuring of the competitive weight classes (in 1993, 1998 and 2018), as of 2019, his 266kg clean and jerk remained the highest ever achieved in competition till broken December 2021 by Lasha Talakhadze’s 267kg, while his total of 476kg remained the highest ever achieved until broken by Lasha Talakhadze of Georgia at the 2019 World Weightlifting Championships while also setting the new clean and jerk record of 264kg for the restructured weight classes. He achieved this by breaking Hossein Rezazadeh's world record from 2004 Summer Olympics in Athens for 263.5kg. 

In 1992, Taranenko represented the Unified Team at the Olympics in Barcelona. He took the silver medal in the super-heavyweight class with a total of 425 kg.

Taranenko's other victories include the 110 kg class titles at the 1980 World and European championships, and super-heavyweight titles at the 1990 World championship and 1988, 1991, and 1996 European championships.

Taranenko has served as a coach for female weightlifters in India.

Career bests 
 Snatch: 210 kg in the class over 110 kg
 Clean and jerk: 266 kg (No longer an official world record due to restructuring of weight classes)
 Total: 442.5 kg (200 + 242.5) 1984 in Varna in the class to 110 kg
 Total: 476 kg (210 + 266), in Canberra, Australia on November 26, 1988, in the class over 110 kg.
 Back Squat: 380 kg with a two-second pause at rock-bottom
 Front Squat: 300 kg for a triple
 Olympic Press: 230 kg

Major result

References

External links 
 Leonid Taranenko at Lift Up
 
 
 

1956 births
Living people
People from Malaryta District
Soviet male weightlifters
Belarusian male weightlifters
Olympic weightlifters of the Soviet Union
Olympic weightlifters of the Unified Team
Olympic weightlifters of Belarus
Weightlifters at the 1980 Summer Olympics
Weightlifters at the 1992 Summer Olympics
Weightlifters at the 1996 Summer Olympics
Olympic gold medalists for the Soviet Union
Olympic silver medalists for the Unified Team
Olympic medalists in weightlifting
World Weightlifting Championships medalists
Medalists at the 1992 Summer Olympics
Medalists at the 1980 Summer Olympics
European Weightlifting Championships medalists
Honoured Masters of Sport of the USSR
Recipients of the Order of Friendship of Peoples
Sportspeople from Brest Region